The Pico IPR is a Portuguese wine region located on the island of Pico in the Portuguese archipelago of the Azores. The region is designated a second-tier Indicação de Proveniencia Regulamentada (IPR) classification, and potentially may be reclassified as a product of Denominação de Origem Controlada (DOC). 

The region is primarily known for fortified wines and historically for the UNESCO designation associated with the Landscape of the Pico Island Vineyard Culture.

History
It is assumed that Franciscan friars brought the first grapes into the lands of Pico during the period of settlement and discovery. This clerics originally constructed churches and imported wine, essential in the celebration of masses through the archipelago. After verifying that the climatic conditions were comparable to Sicilly, they began to import various plants and wine castes, in particular, Verdelho. The vine began to proliferate easily throughout the island. Quickly, the wine produced turned famous and began to be exported into northern Europe and Russia.

With a climate characterized by weak temperature oscillation and elevated precipitation, and distributed throughout the year, allowed the production of white liqueur wines. This wine resulted from the grapes produced predominantly in the Lajido soils of the parishes. This tradition, which first began on Pico and that continues today was behind the designation of Pico's Vineyard Culture as a UNESCO Heritage Site.

Geography

Grapes
The Pico IPR wine is commonly a white liqueur wine produced from grapes grown on rocky soils, located near the western coast of the island of Pico. The area of vine is quite reduced; vines are divided in tiny plots, called currais, edged by walls made of loose pebbles, with the purpose of protecting the plants from the wind.

The principle grapes of the Pico region include Arinto, Terrantez and Verdelho.

See also
 List of Portuguese wine regions

References
Notes

Sources
 

Wine_regions_of_Portugal